Colonel Samuel Gillmor Haughton (1 December 1889 – 19 May 1959) was a politician who was elected in 1945 as an Ulster Unionist MP for Antrim

References

External links 
 

1889 births
1959 deaths
Members of the Parliament of the United Kingdom for County Antrim constituencies (since 1922)
Ulster Unionist Party members of the House of Commons of the United Kingdom
UK MPs 1945–1950
Royal Artillery officers
British Army personnel of World War II